The men's pole vault event at the 2002 Commonwealth Games was held on 30 July.

Results

References
Official results
Results at BBC

Pole
2002